The Cambridge Companions series of Cambridge University Press "are a series of authoritative guides" written by academic scholars on topics and periods related to Literature and Classics, Music, and Philosophy, Religion and Culture.

They are similar in some ways to the Routledge Companions published by Routledge and the Oxford Handbooks published by Oxford University Press.

Volumes
List of Cambridge Companions to Literature and Classics
List of Cambridge Companions to Music
List of Cambridge Companions to Philosophy, Religion and Culture

External links
 All subjects
 Browse subjects
 Cambridge Companions

Cambridge University Press books
Series of books